Väinö Kallio (17 April 1897, Pihlajavesi – 9 February 1938) was a Socialist Workers' Party of Finland politician. He supported the Reds in the Finnish Civil War of 1918. He served in the Parliament of Finland from 1929 to 1930. In 1933, he was exiled by the Government of Finland to the Soviet Union. During the Great Purge, he was arrested and imprisoned on January 1, 1938 and later executed. After the death of Joseph Stalin, he was rehabilitated in 1958.

Sources
 
 KASNTn NKVDn vuosina 1937–1938 rankaisemien Suomen Eduskunnan entisten jäsenten luettelo

1897 births
1938 deaths
People from Keuruu
People from Vaasa Province (Grand Duchy of Finland)
Socialist Electoral Organisation of Workers and Smallholders politicians
Communist Party of Finland politicians
Members of the Parliament of Finland (1929–30)
People of the Finnish Civil War (Red side)
Great Purge victims from Finland
People executed by the Soviet Union
Soviet rehabilitations
Executed communists